Matt Bettencourt (born April 12, 1975) is an American professional golfer.

Born in Alameda, California, Bettencourt turned professional in 2001 after attending Modesto Junior College.

In 2008, Bettencourt won twice on the Nationwide Tour, at the Oregon Classic in September and a month and a half later at the season-ending Nationwide Tour Championship at TPC Craig Ranch. The second win took him from 12th to 1st in the money list, therefore earning him his 2009 PGA Tour card. He finished 111th on the PGA Tour money list in 2009 to retain his card for 2010. In 2010, he gained his first PGA Tour win at the Reno-Tahoe Open, one shot ahead of Bob Heintz after Heintz missed a  birdie putt on the 72nd hole. This win ensures PGA Tour exemption for Bettencourt until the end of the 2012 season in a tough season that saw Bettencourt make 14 cuts in 32 appearances.

Bettencourt split time in 2013 between the Web.com Tour and PGA Tour. He finished 16th on the 2013 Web.com Tour regular season money list to earn his 2014 PGA Tour card. In 2014, he made only 4 cuts in 14 events and finished 211th on the FedEx Cup points list, therefore he lost his PGA Tour card and also missed the Web.com Tour Finals. The finish demoted Bettencourt to the past champions category for the 2014-15 season and forced him to Web.com Tour Qualifying School.

Professional wins (6)

PGA Tour wins (1)

Web.com Tour wins (2)

Web.com Tour playoff record (0–2)

Other wins (3)
2002 Northern California Open
2003 Northern California Open
2007 Northern California Open

Results in major championships

CUT = missed the half-way cut
"T" = tied for place

Summary

Most consecutive cuts made – 2 (2009 U.S. Open – 2010 U.S. Open)
Longest streak of top-10s – 1

Results in The Players Championship

CUT = missed the halfway cut

See also
2008 Nationwide Tour graduates
2013 Web.com Tour Finals graduates

External links

American male golfers
PGA Tour golfers
Korn Ferry Tour graduates
Golfers from California
Sportspeople from Alameda, California
People from Duncan, South Carolina
1975 births
Living people